Deborah Geffner (born August 26, 1952) is an American actress, singer, and dancer.

Early life 
Born in Pittsburgh, Geffner moved to New York City at the age of sixteen to train at the Juilliard School. She later danced for the Stuttgart Ballet and American Chamber Ballet.

Career 
She is best known for her role as Victoria Porter in Bob Fosse's award-winning movie All That Jazz, which she filmed while performing in A Chorus Line on Broadway in the role of Kristine.

Geffner worked again with Fosse in his movie Star 80. She also starred in the TV movie Legs with Gwen Verdon and Sheree North. She has been on TV shows like Scandal, Mad Men, Cold Case, Grey's Anatomy, Monk, Criminal Minds, ER, Tales of the Unexpected and Passions.

Geffner can also be seen in the movies Living Out Loud with Holly Hunter, Infestation, Exterminator 2, Chasing Destiny with Christopher Lloyd, and as herself in the documentary Store. In 2009 she wrote, directed and starred in the award-winning short film Guitar Lessons.

She directed John Patrick Shanley's play, Beggars in the House of Plenty, at Theatre 68 in Hollywood as part of their "13 by Shanley" Festival in 2009. In 2011, she directed Portrait of a Madonna and performed in Auto-Da-Fé by Tennessee Williams, also at Theatre 68, as part of the "Five by Tenn" Festival. In 2012 she directed the world premiere of "Jennifer Aniston Stole My Life" in the Hollywood Fringe Festival, chosen for Best of Fringe. She also briefly played Gwendolyn Gardner on the soap opera The Young and the Restless in November 2020.

Personal life 
She lives in Los Angeles where she continues to act and direct movies and plays.

Filmography

Film

Television

References

External links

Living people
1952 births